Murder by the Book is a Nero Wolfe detective novel by Rex Stout published in 1951 by the Viking Press, and collected in the omnibus volume Royal Flush (1965).

Plot summary
Inspector Cramer takes the unprecedented step of approaching Nero Wolfe for his help on a stalled murder investigation. Leonard Dykes, a clerk for a law partnership, was found dead in the East River. The police found in Dykes' apartment a list of men's names and Cramer wishes to have Wolfe's opinion on it. But other than suggesting Dykes may have been trying to invent an alias, Wolfe can't help.

A month later Wolfe, is approached by the father of Joan Wellman, a reader for a fiction publisher, who was killed in a hit-and-run incident, late at night in Van Cortlandt Park. After reading a recent letter that Joan had written to her parents, Wolfe realises that the name ‘Baird Archer’, an author whose novel Joan was reading for her employer, had also appeared on the list found in Leonard Dykes’ apartment.

Wolfe orders Archie Goodwin to explore the link between Archer's novel and the two murder victims. To that end, Archie arrives at the office of Rachel Abrams, a stenographer, mere minutes after she has been thrown out of a window to her death. In the moments before the police arrive Archie confirms that Baird Archer was one of her clients. Wolfe decides to begin the investigation with Dykes, and Archie arranges a meeting with the female employees of Corrigan, Phelps, Kustin and Briggs, the law partnership Dykes worked for. During the meeting, tempers flare and in a resulting argument the former senior partner of the firm, Conroy O’Malley, is mentioned. O’Malley was disbarred for bribing a jury foreman to fix a case, and while Dykes was blamed for exposing him to the Bar Association it becomes clear that all four of the partners have motives to betray him.

Soon after, the four lawyers—James Corrigan, Emmet Phelps, Louis Kustin and Frederick Briggs—approach Wolfe, keen to avoid further scandal. The men agree to send Wolfe all correspondence relating to Dykes, including a resignation letter he submitted. When they receive the letter, Wolfe and Archie discover an odd notation, apparently in Corrigan's handwriting, which corresponds a verse in the Book of Psalms. The same verse - “Put not your trust in princes, nor in the son of man, in whom there is no help” - was used for the title of Baird Archer's novel, which confirms to Wolfe that Archer was a pen name of Dykes and his novel a Roman à clef based on O'Malley's downfall.

Archie is dispatched to Los Angeles to persuade Dykes's sister Peggy to help them trap her brother's murderer. Archie writes a letter to the law firm purportedly from Peggy asking for advice over the legal rights of her brother's novel, and hires a local private detective to pose as a literary agent. Soon after, James Corrigan unsuccessfully tries to acquire the manuscript, resorting to violence and attempted theft in order to do so. Archie begins to tail Corrigan, but soon after his return to New York Wolfe receives a rambling phone call, apparently from James Corrigan, which is abruptly ended with the sound of a gunshot. The police discover that Corrigan has apparently committed suicide, and the next day Wolfe receives a suicide note written by Corrigan confessing to having exposed O’Malley and committed all three murders to keep his secret.

Although the authorities are willing to rule Corrigan the murderer and his death a suicide, Wolfe has a breakthrough and summons the major witnesses to his office. There, he reveals that the supposed suicide note was flawed in one crucial respect; it claimed that Corrigan was aware of the contents of Dykes’ novel, when in fact Corrigan's actions in Los Angeles clearly demonstrated that he had never seen the manuscript before. In fact, Corrigan was murdered by Conroy O’Malley, who had staged his death as a suicide. O’Malley had discovered that Corrigan had betrayed him via Dykes's manuscript and had committed the other murders both to frame Corrigan and cover up his actions. After holes in his alibi are discovered, O’Malley is charged and convicted of murder.

Reviews and commentary
 Anthony Boucher, The New York Times Book Review (October 28, 1951) — For some years now Nero Wolfe has flourished best in novelettes ... The shorter exploits, annually collected in volumes of three, have been models of the middle-length detective story; but some of us have still yearned nostalgically for the days of such Wolfe novels as Too Many Cooks and The League of Frightened Men. It's a pleasure at last to report that in Murder by the Book Rex Stout restores Nero Wolfe to his proper place in the long detective novel. A man has been murdered presumably because of a novel which he wrote and which has completely disappeared; there is apparently as total an absence of clues as ever confronted a fictional detective. And the story is not so much one of detection, as of the ingenious efforts of Wolfe and the incomparable Archie Goodwin to find some conceivable starting point from which detection can be carried on. It's an odd and interesting approach; the solution is at once plausible and surprising (if not quite deductively watertight). Wolfe and Archie are both in top form and Stout has rarely done a better novelistic job of putting flesh on assorted minor characters.
 Stuart M. Kaminsky — I am a huge Stout fan. I've got a collection of the Wolfe novels and re-read them. I just finished reading Murder by the Book, definitely one of my favorites in the series. Check Stout's scenes of Archie in Los Angeles. They rank right up there with Chandler, and the characters — major and minor — are vivid and memorable, not to mention the great give-and-take between Wolfe and Archie.
 Nancy Pearl, Book Lust — When Stout is on top of his game, which is most of the time, his diabolically clever plotting and his storytelling ability exceed that of any other mystery writer you can name, including Agatha Christie, who invented her own eccentric genius detective Hercule Poirot. Although in the years since Stout's death I find myself going back and rereading his entire oeuvre every year or two, I return with particular pleasure to these five novels: The Doorbell Rang; Plot It Yourself; Murder by the Book; Champagne for One; and Gambit.
 Saturday Review of Literature (November 10, 1951) — Missing novel MS is lethal to NY quartet and disrupts high-toned law office, but orchidaphilic Nero Wolfe pins blue ribbon on felon. Usual scrupulous attention to, and skilled management of, detail; honest, lively, interest-holding performance.
Terry Teachout, About Last Night, "Forty years with Nero Wolfe" (January 12, 2009) — Rex Stout's witty, fast-moving prose hasn't dated a day, while Wolfe himself is one of the enduringly great eccentrics of popular fiction. I've spent the past four decades reading and re-reading Stout's novels for pleasure, and they have yet to lose their savor  ... It is to revel in such writing that I return time and again to Stout's books, and in particular to The League of Frightened Men, Some Buried Caesar, The Silent Speaker, Too Many Women, Murder by the Book, Before Midnight, Plot It Yourself, Too Many Clients, The Doorbell Rang, and Death of a Doxy, which are for me the best of all the full-length Wolfe novels.

Adaptations

Nero Wolfe (Paramount Television)
Murder by the Book was adapted as the eighth episode of Nero Wolfe (1981), an NBC TV series starring William Conrad as Nero Wolfe and Lee Horsley as Archie Goodwin. Other members of the regular cast include George Voskovec (Fritz Brenner), Robert Coote (Theodore Horstmann), George Wyner (Saul Panzer) and Allan Miller (Inspector Cramer). Guest stars include Walter Brooke (George [Frederick] Briggs), Delta Burke (Jean Wellmann), Ed Gilbert (Robert [Emmett] Phelps), David Hedison (Phillip [James] Corrigan) and John Randolph (Ryan [Conroy] O'Malley). Directed by Bob Kelljan from a teleplay by Wallace Ware (David Karp), "Murder by the Book" aired March 13, 1981.

Andre Malraux reference

During his foray to California, Archie Goodwin contracts with a local detective agency for a detective able to impersonate a literary agent, and rejects several candidates who don't fit the role. The one who is finally chosen (and performs to great satisfaction) surprises Goodwin by reading in his spare time a serious philosophical book named Twilight of the Absolute. (Goodwin himself, when later left alone, glances at this book but does not care to read it, preferring to pass his time with newspapers and magazines.)

Stout does not specify the name of the writer of Twilight of the Absolute. In fact it is a book by Andre Malraux, translated from French and published in the US by Pantheon Books in 1950, one year before the present book .

Publication history
1951, New York: The Viking Press, October 12, 1951, hardcover
In his limited-edition pamphlet, Collecting Mystery Fiction #9, Rex Stout's Nero Wolfe Part I, Otto Penzler describes the first edition of Murder by the Book: "Yellow cloth, front cover and spine printed with red; rear cover blank. Issued in a yellow, red, black and white dust wrapper."
In April 2006, Firsts: The Book Collector's Magazine estimated that the first edition of Murder by the Book (featured on the cover of the magazine) had a value of between $400 and $750. The estimate is for a copy in very good to fine condition in a like dustjacket.
1952, New York: Viking (Mystery Guild), January 1952, hardcover
The far less valuable Viking book club edition may be distinguished from the first edition in three ways:
 The dust jacket has "Book Club Edition" printed on the inside front flap, and the price is absent (first editions may be price clipped if they were given as gifts).
 Book club editions are sometimes thinner and always taller (usually a quarter of an inch) than first editions.
 Book club editions are bound in cardboard, and first editions are bound in cloth (or have at least a cloth spine).
1952, London: Collins Crime Club, April 7, 1952, hardcover 
1954, New York: Bantam #1252, August 1954, paperback
London: Collins (White Circle), #295c, not dated, paperback
1964, New York: The Viking Press, Royal Flush: The Fourth Nero Wolfe Omnibus (with Fer-de-Lance and Three Witnesses), July 23, 1965, hardcover
1967, London: Fontana #1534, 1967, paperback
1974, London: Penguin Books, 1974, paperback
1995, New York: Bantam , September 1, 1995, paperback
2006, Auburn, California: The Audio Partners Publishing Corp., Mystery Masters  June 28, 2006 [1995], CD (unabridged, read by Michael Prichard)
2010, New York: Bantam , May 12, 2010, e-book

References

External links

1951 American novels
Nero Wolfe novels by Rex Stout
Viking Press books
Novels set in New York City